A privateer is a pirate operating on behalf of a government.

Privateer may also refer to:

 Privateer (motorsport), a competitor in motorsports who does not have manufacturer support
 Consolidated PB4Y-2 Privateer, a naval version of the B-24 Liberator bomber
 Wing Commander: Privateer and its expansion pack Privateer: Righteous Fire, a 1993 video game
 "Privateers" (The West Wing), a 2003 episode of The West Wing TV series
 New Orleans Privateers, sports teams at the University of New Orleans
 Privateer Press, publisher of tabletop role-playing games
 USS Privateer (SP-179), later YP-179, a United States Navy patrol vessel in commission from 1917 to 1930
 Privateering (album), a 2012 album by Mark Knopfler and a track on the album
 Privateer (album), a 2007 album by Tim Renwick
 Privateer, South Carolina
 Pirateer, a board game